Johann von Wonnecke Caub or Johannes de Cuba (1430–1503), is the attributed author of an early printed book on natural history, which was published in Mainz by Peter Schöffer in 1485 under the name of Gart der Gesundheit.

References

1430 births
1503 deaths
Scientists from Frankfurt
Natural scientists